Jewish liturgy is the customary public worship of Judaism. The liturgy may include responsive reading, songs, or music, as found in the Torah and Haftorah, the Amidah, piyyutim, and Psalms. Singing or reading the Psalms has a special role in the Jewish liturgy, in particular they are used in the daily Jewish prayer services of Shacharit, Mincha, and Arvit. 

Torah reading is done every morning on Shabbat. In Babylonia, it was a one-year pattern, instead of a three-year pattern as done in Israel.

Over the last 2000 years, traditional variations have emerged among the traditional liturgical customs of different Jewish communities, such as Ashkenazic, Sephardic, Yemenite, Eretz Yisrael and others, or rather recent liturgical inventions such as Hassidic, and Chabad. However the differences are minor compared with the commonalities. Most of the Jewish liturgy is sung or chanted with traditional melodies or trope. Synagogues may designate or employ a professional or lay hazzan (cantor) for the purpose of leading the congregation in prayer, especially on Shabbat or holidays.

Denominational variations

Conservative services generally use the same basic format for services as in Orthodox Judaism, with some doctrinal leniencies and some prayers in English. In practice, there is wide variation among Conservative congregations. In traditionalist congregations the liturgy can be almost identical to that of Orthodox Judaism, almost entirely in Hebrew (and Aramaic), with a few minor exceptions, including excision of a study session on Temple sacrifices, and modifications of prayers for the restoration of the sacrificial system. In more liberal Conservative synagogues there are greater changes to the service, with up to a third of the service in English; abbreviation or omission of many of the preparatory prayers; and replacement of some traditional prayers with more contemporary forms. There are some changes for doctrinal reasons, including egalitarian language, fewer references to restoring sacrifices in the Temple in Jerusalem, and an option to eliminate special roles for Kohanim and Levites.

The liturgies of Reform and Reconstructionist are based on traditional elements, but contains language more reflective of liberal belief than the traditional liturgy. Doctrinal revisions generally include revising or omitting references to traditional doctrines such as bodily resurrection, a personal Jewish Messiah, and other elements of traditional Jewish eschatology, Divine revelation of the Torah at Mount Sinai, angels, conceptions of reward and punishment, and other personal miraculous and supernatural elements. Services are often from 40% to 90% in the vernacular.

Reform Judaism has made greater alterations to the traditional service in accord with its more liberal theology including dropping references to traditional elements of Jewish eschatology such as a personal Messiah, a bodily resurrection of the dead, and others. The Hebrew portion of the service is substantially abbreviated and modernized and modern prayers substituted for traditional ones. In addition, in keeping with their view that the laws of Shabbat (including a traditional prohibition on playing instruments) are inapplicable to modern circumstances, Reform services often play instrumental or recorded music with prayers on the Jewish Sabbath. All Reform synagogues are egalitarian with respect to gender roles.

References
 
 
 

Jewish law and rituals
Jewish services